Formicomimus is a genus of beetle in the Pseudocephalini tribe, native to Australia. It contains a single species, Formicomimus mirabilis.

References 

Cerambycinae
Monotypic Cerambycidae genera
Beetles of Australia=